Following is a list of courthouses in Arizona at the state, county, and federal level. Each entry indicates the name of the building along with an image, if available, its location and the jurisdiction it covers.

County courthouses

 Missing are courthouses for counties of Greenlee, Apache, La Paz, and Coconino. Their respective county seats are Clifton, St. Johns, Parker, and Flagstaff. The courthouse present for Cochise County is not the current courthouse, which is in the county seat of Bisbee. This newest courthouse dates from the early 1930s.

United States federal courthouses

See also
List of Federal courthouses in the United States

References

 
Arizona
Courthouses